Li Qiang (born 23 July 1959) is a Chinese politician who has served as the 8th and current premier of the State Council of China since March 2023. He has served as the second-ranking member on the Chinese Communist Party (CCP) Central Committee Politburo Standing Committee since October 2022. He previously served as party secretary of Shanghai City from 2017 to 2022, party secretary of Jiangsu Province from 2016 to 2017, and governor of Zhejiang Province from 2012 to 2016.

Having joined the CCP in 1983, he first became secretary of the Communist Youth League of Rui'an, Zhejiang. Later serving in provincial department of civil affairs, he later became the party secretary of Yong Kang, Wenzhou, the Political Legal Affairs Secretary of Zhejiang and later the deputy party secretary of the province. He became the governor of Zhejiang in 2012, later the party secretary of Jiangsu province, and finally the party secretary of Shanghai in 2017. In the same year he was elevated to become a member of the CCP Politburo.

During his tenure in Shanghai, he opened the Shanghai Stock Exchange STAR Market, oversaw foreign investment in the city including Gigafactory Shanghai of Tesla, Inc., eased the requirements for internal migrants to obtain residency permits, and created five new towns to decrease the land supply shortage. Li oversaw a two-month lockdown in Shanghai in 2022, and was later that year promoted to the Politburo Standing Committee. In 2023, he became premier, succeeding Li Keqiang. Having served together with current CCP general secretary Xi Jinping in Zhejiang, Li is seen as a close ally of Xi. Despite his closeness to Xi, Li is also generally regarded as pro-business and has voiced support for economic reforms.

Early life and education 
Li was born in Rui'an, Zhejiang in July 1959. He was a worker in the Irrigation Pump Station of Mayu District, Rui'an County from 1976 to 1977, and worked in the Third Tool Factory of Rui'an from 1977 to 1978.

Li Qiang studied agricultural mechanization at the Ningbo Branch of Zhejiang Agricultural University (now Zhejiang Wanli College) from 1978 to 1982 after the resumption of Gaokao. He studied sociology by correspondence at the private China Sociology Correspondence University (defunct in 2021) in Beijing from 1985 to 1987.

Li attended Zhejiang University for on-the-job graduate studies in management engineering from 1995 to 1997 and the Central Party School for on-the-job graduate studies in world economics from 2001 to 2004. He attended Hong Kong Polytechnic University from 2003 to 2005 and received an executive Master of Business Administration in 2005.

Local leaderships

Zhejiang 
Li joined the Chinese Communist Party (CCP) in April 1983. He was the secretary of the Communist Youth League of Rui'an County. He then served in progressively senior roles in the provincial department of civil affairs. He later became the Communist Party secretary of the city of Yongkang, and then party secretary of the prefecture-level city of Wenzhou. By then he was only 43, and was the youngest party secretary of Wenzhou in history. In 2004, Li became the secretary-general of Zhejiang's Provincial Party Committee and earned a seat on its  Standing Committee in the next year, serving under then Zhejiang's party secretary, Xi Jinping, in charge of administration and coordination. During this time, he became close to Xi, eventually being regarded as a close ally of him. In February 2011, he became the Political and Legal Affairs Secretary of Zhejiang province, and several months later was made deputy party secretary.

According to Guangming Daily in 2015, during his tenure in Zhejiang Li told a professor at the Zhejiang University that the province's local government needed an "independent think-tank like the RAND Corporation" to evaluate its performance, saying that it was "very difficult" for official organizations and officials to give objective analysis and criticize their superiors. This led the professor to establish a non-governmental group of experts in 2009, with Li as its honorary director.

After the 18th CCP National Congress, he became an alternate member of the CCP Central Committee. On December 21, 2012, he became the acting governor of Zhejiang, succeeding Xia Baolong who was promoted to the provincial party secretary, and was officially elected as governor on January 30, 2013. He served as governor until July 4, 2016. During his tenure in Zhejiang, he asked the non-governmental group of experts to write reports on his performance that "tell the truth", and later paid them a visit for a face-to-face feedback after feeling their first reports weren't critical enough.

In 2014, when Zhejiang was preparing to hold an international internet conference, Li proposed that the host city turn into a pilot zone for unblocking China's strict internet controls for Western firms, an idea that was ultimately not approved by the central leadership. He also started a project to create small towns that have a pro-business climate and good physical environments, a project endorsed and spread to rest of China by Xi. The Economist reported in 2023 that "many such towns became speculative hotspots for housing developers".

Jiangsu 
In 2015, Li accompanied CCP leader Xi Jinping on a state visit to the United States. On June 30, 2016, Li was named party secretary of Jiangsu province. He served for 15 months, becoming the shortest serving Jiangsu party secretary in the history of the People's Republic. During his tenure, he arranged meetings with business officials such as Jack Ma of Alibaba Group to encourage investments.

Shanghai 
On October 29, 2017, following the 19th Party Congress, Li was appointed as the party secretary of Shanghai. He was also appointed as a member of the CCP Politburo in the same year. He is considered to be "business-friendly", having implemented pro-business policies while in Shanghai such as the opening of the Shanghai Stock Exchange STAR Market. He oversaw increasing foreign investment in the city, including the gigafactory of Tesla, Inc. He has also implemented policies like lowering the threshold for internal migrants to obtain residency permits and creating five new towns to lessen the land supply shortage. In 2022, Li was blamed for a two-month lockdown in Shanghai, which significantly impacted the economy. Nevertheless, reportedly he was more open to the idea with living with COVID. According to The Wall Street Journal, Li is one of the few people in the top leadership that wants China to introduce Western mRNA vaccines against COVID-19. Reportedly, he tried to arrange for BioNTech to provide its vaccines in China.

Premiership 

Following the first plenary session of the 20th CCP Central Committee, Li was appointed to the CCP Politburo Standing Committee. He was expected to become premier in 2023, the first since 1976 to rise directly to premiership from local government without any prior working experience in the central government, especially as a vice premier. Observers have said that the lack of Beijing experience makes him heavily dependent on support from Xi to run the State Council. Reuters reported on 3 March 2023, citing sources, that Li pushed for the quick relaxation of zero-COVID rules in late 2022, resisting pressure from Xi, who wanted to slow the pace of the reopening. It also reported that Li had become the head of the CCP's COVID taskforce, and had also encouraged local governments to continue loosening COVID restrictions.

Li took office as premier on 11 March, taking over from Li Keqiang. He is the first person since Zhou Enlai to be premier without holding prior office as vice-premier.

Political views

Economy and business 
Despite his closeness to Xi, Li is seen as pro-business and supportive of economic reforms. According to The Economist, "[r]educing bureaucratic interference in the market is one of his favourite themes". In 2003 during his tenure in Wenzhou, he said that "without the private economy, Wenzhou’s urban development would be set back by at least a century". In 2014, Li said that "there should be more Alibabas and more Jack Mas". Li said in 2015 that economic reforms were a matter of "life and death" and that "the government cannot be an unlimited government." He also said that "to build a limited yet effective modern government, you need to transfer a lot of managerial power to social organizations." According to The Wall Street Journal, Li has close ties with Jack Ma. The newspaper also reported that Li suggested to the government to ease its regulatory actions against businesses and acted as a mediatory between businesses and the government during the government's crackdown on private businesses.

Personal life 
Unusual in senior Chinese politics, Li has emphasized his local identity, namely his ties to Wenzhou. He set up the World Wenzhounese Conference to encourage members of the global Wenzhounese diaspora to invest back in the city, and told the conference in 2013 that "I was born and bred a Wenzhounese" and "[t]he Wenzhounese spirit of daring to be the first and especially of strong entrepreneurship has always inspired and nourished me".

References

External links 
 New PM Li Qiang further boosts Zhejiang faction in CCP, Intelligence Online, March 17, 2023 (requires free registration)

1959 births
Living people
Alternate members of the 18th Central Committee of the Chinese Communist Party
Chinese Communist Party politicians from Zhejiang
Delegates to the 18th National Congress of the Chinese Communist Party
Delegates to the 19th National Congress of the Chinese Communist Party
Delegates to the 20th National Congress of the Chinese Communist Party
Delegates to the 10th National People's Congress
Delegates to the 11th National People's Congress
Delegates to the 12th National People's Congress
Delegates to the 13th National People's Congress
Delegates to the 14th National People's Congress
Governors of Zhejiang
Members of the 18th Central Committee of the Chinese Communist Party
Members of the 19th Politburo of the Chinese Communist Party
Members of the 20th Politburo Standing Committee of the Chinese Communist Party
People from Rui'an
People's Republic of China politicians from Zhejiang
Politicians from Wenzhou
Secretaries of the Communist Party Shanghai Committee
Premiers of the People's Republic of China